WVS may refer to:

 Women's Royal Voluntary Service (WRVS)
 World Values Survey, a global research project that explores people’s values and beliefs
 Worldwide Veterinary Service
 Warwickshire Vision Support, a UK charity providing support for people with sight loss in Warwickshire
 A virtual scripting language based on XML. 
 WebSphere Voice Server, a Speech Recognition  product from IBM that provides automatic ASR and TTS functions for solutions supporting MRCP or Media Resource Control Protocol.